The 1974 Idaho gubernatorial election was held on Tuesday, November 5. Incumbent Democrat Cecil Andrus soundly defeated Republican nominee Jack Murphy, the lieutenant governor, with 70.92% of the vote.

Primary elections
Primary elections were held on Tuesday, August 6, 1974; both major party candidates were unopposed.

Democratic primary

Candidate
Cecil Andrus, Lewiston, incumbent governor

Republican primary

Candidate
Jack Murphy, Shoshone, lieutenant governor

General election

Candidates
Major party candidates
Cecil Andrus, Democratic
Jack Murphy, Republican 

Other candidates
Nolan Victor, American

Results

References

1974
Idaho
Gubernatorial